Durno is a surname. Notable people with the surname include:

Chris Durno (born 1980), Canadian ice hockey player
Edwin Durno (1899–1976), American physician, politician, and infantry sergeant
James Durno (1745–1795), British historical painter
Jeannette Durno, Canadian-born American pianist